Shiba Pada Bhattacharjee  is an Indian politician belonging to the Communist Party of India. He was elected to the West Bengal Legislative Assembly from Baranagar constituency in 1972 defeating Jyoti Basu by over 38,987 votes. He earlier used to be a campaigner for Jyoti Basu in earlier elections in Baranagar when the Communist Party of India was undivided.

References

Living people
Communist Party of India politicians from West Bengal
West Bengal MLAs 1972–1977
1936 births